Sam Hirst (31 March 1875 — 17 January 1937) was an English first-class cricketer.

Hirst was born in March 1875 at Netherton, Yorkshire. A professional cricketer, he became the professional for Uddingston Cricket Club in 1899. He was selected to represent Scotland in a first-class match against the touring Australians at Edinburgh in 1905. Playing as an opening batsman, he scored 28 runs in the Scottish first innings before being dismissed by Charlie McLeod, while in their second innings he was dismissed for 33 runs by the same bowler. He left his role at Uddingston as a player–coach in September 1905, being replaced by the Yorkshire professional Arthur Broadbent. Hirst died in January 1937 at Almondbury, Yorkshire.

Notes

References

1875 births
1937 deaths
People from Kirklees (district)
English cricketers
Scotland cricketers
English cricket coaches